SOSI is a geospatial vector data format predominantly used for exchange of geographical information in Norway.

SOSI is short for Samordnet Opplegg for Stedfestet Informasjon (literally "Coordinated Approach for Spatial Information", but more commonly expanded in English to Systematic Organization of Spatial Information).

The standard includes standardized definitions for geometry and topology, data quality, coordinate systems, attributes and metadata.

The open standard was developed by the Norwegian Mapping and Cadastre Authority. It was first published in 1987 (version 1.0). It is continuously being revised and further developed. The long term development points towards international standards (ISO 19100). This work is being done by ISO/TC211, currently chaired by Olaf Østensen with the Norwegian Mapping and Cadastre Authority.

References

Further reading

References
 GML 3.1 specification (requires EULA to read)
 Digital Earth: GeoWeb
 GeoRSS - Geographically Encoded Objects for RSS Feeds
 Recommended XMLGML encoding of common CRS definitions, Open Geospatial Consortium
 Demonstration of a Coordinate Reference System Registry, Open Geospatial Consortium
 Coordinate Reference System Registry of the OGP, - Supersedes above demonstration registry. OGP = Oil and Gas Producers Association.
 C++ Data Binding for GML
 sosi2kml utility

GIS file formats